AlohAAA is an EP by the group AAA (or Attack All Around).

Track listing
 Wonderful Life
 太陽
 ハリケーン・リリ, ボストン・マリ
 Virgin F
 地球に抱かれて
 Shalala キボウの歌

AAA (band) albums
2007 EPs
Avex Group EPs
Japanese-language EPs